Florence Halop (January 23, 1923 – July 15, 1986) was an American actress. Best known for her roles as surly patient Mrs. Hufnagel on the drama St. Elsewhere and the raspy-voiced bailiff Florence Kleiner on the sitcom Night Court. Halop was the sister of Billy Halop, one of the original Dead End/East Side Kids.

Early years
Halop was from a theatrical family.  She was born in Jamaica, New York.  Her mother was a dancer, and her brother, Billy Halop, was an actor who worked on radio, in films, and in television.

Radio
An item in a 1931 newspaper reported that Halop was "the youngest star of the National Broadcasting Company -- only 7 and broadcasting for the last three years." She first appeared on Coast-to-Coast on a Bus. Later, she was heard on Wheatenaville. Halop was the second of many to play Miss Duffy, the owner's man-crazy daughter in Duffy's Tavern. She was Hot Breath Houlihan on The Jimmy Durante Show.

Television

Halop transitioned to television in the early 1950s with a role in the series Meet Millie. After the series ended in 1956, Halop guest starred on various television series during the late 1950s and 1960s including roles in Playhouse 90, Going My Way, and I Spy. Between 1976 and 1982, she guested six times on the TV series Barney Miller, each time playing a different character. In 1984, she had a guest stint on St. Elsewhere. Halop's character, Mrs. Hufnagel, was originally intended to be a one-episode spot, but her role was so well received the writers found a way to get her into 17 more episodes over the course of the season.

In 1985, Halop succeeded Selma Diamond as a bailiff on Night Court after Diamond's death from lung cancer. Halop, who was also a heavy smoker, had similarly developed lung cancer and died during the series run. She was replaced on Night Court by Marsha Warfield, who played Roz Russell until the series ended in 1992.

Family
Halop was married to George Gruskin, who died in 1976. They were the parents of two daughters, Georgeanna and Benita. She is buried in Valhalla Memorial Park Cemetery.

Filmography

References

External links

 
 New York Times Florence Halop page
 

1923 births
1986 deaths
20th-century American actresses
Actresses from New York City
American child actresses
American film actresses
American radio actresses
American television actresses
Burials at Valhalla Memorial Park Cemetery
Jewish American actresses
Deaths from lung cancer in California
People from Jamaica, Queens
20th-century American Jews